Chariots of the Gods? Unsolved Mysteries of the Past (in English, Memories of the Future: Unsolved Mysteries of the Past) is a book written in 1968 by Erich von Däniken and translated from the original German by Michael Heron. It involves the hypothesis that the technologies and religions of many ancient civilizations were given to them by ancient astronauts who were welcomed as gods.

The first draft of the publication had been rejected by a variety of publishers. The book was extensively rewritten by its editor, Wilhelm Roggersdorf (a pen name of the German screenwriter Wilhelm Utermann).

Summary

The main thesis of Chariots of the Gods is that extraterrestrial beings influenced ancient technology. Von Däniken suggests that some ancient structures and artifacts appear to reflect more sophisticated technological knowledge than is known or presumed to have existed at the times they were manufactured. Von Däniken maintains that these artifacts were produced either by extraterrestrial visitors or by humans who learned the necessary knowledge from extraterrestrials. Many of those theories have now been debunked.

Such artifacts include the Egyptian pyramids, Stonehenge, and the Moai of Easter Island. Further examples include an early world map known as the Piri Reis map, which von Däniken describes as showing Earth as it is seen from space, and the Nazca Lines in Peru, which he suggests may have been constructed by humans as crude replicas of previous alien structures, as a way to call the aliens back to Earth. He uses this same explanation to argue that cart ruts in Malta may have had extraterrestrial purposes along with similar lines in Australia, Saudi Arabia, and the Aral Sea.

The book also suggests that ancient artwork throughout the world can be interpreted as depicting astronauts, air and space vehicles, extraterrestrials, and complex technology. Von Däniken describes elements that he believes are similar in the art of unrelated cultures. Among the artwork he describes are ancient Japanese Dogū figurines (which he believes to resemble astronauts in spacesuits) and 3,000-year-old carvings in an Egyptian New Kingdom Temple that appear to depict helicopter-like machines.

The book further suggests that the origins of many religions, including interpretations of the Old Testament of the Bible, are reactions to contact with an alien race. According to von Däniken, humans considered the technology of the aliens to be supernatural and the aliens themselves to be gods. Von Däniken asks if the oral and literal traditions of most religions contain references to visitors from stars and vehicles traveling through air and space. These, he says, should be interpreted as literal descriptions which have changed during the passage of time and become more obscure.

Examples include Ezekiel's vision of the angels and the wheels, which Von Däniken interprets as a description of a spacecraft; the Ark of the Covenant, which is explained as a device intended for communication with an alien race; and the destruction of Sodom by fire and brimstone, which is interpreted as a nuclear explosion. Von Däniken attempts to draw an analogy with the "cargo cults" that formed during and after World War II, when once-isolated tribes in the South Pacific mistook the advanced American and Japanese soldiers for gods.

Von Däniken also spends around one-third of the book discussing the possibility that humans could theoretically offer primitive civilizations on interstellar worlds advanced technology by the year 2100. This would, he writes, mimic the ancient extraterrestrial contact von Däniken believes to have occurred on Earth.

Reception

Academic dismissals 
Von Däniken's book, and much of his subsequent publications such as Gods from Outer Space and The Gold of the Gods, have drawn largely negative receptions from the academic mainstream despite being popular best-sellers. Many scientists and historians have rejected his ideas, claiming that the book's conclusions were based on faulty, pseudoscientific evidence, some of which was later demonstrated to be fraudulent or fabricated, and under illogical premises.

An internationally bestselling book by Clifford Wilson, Crash Go the Chariots, was published in 1972. Ronald Story's 1976 book rebutting von Däniken's ideas was titled The Space Gods Revealed.  Another negative criticism of von Däniken's book came from archeologist Kenneth Feder in his book Frauds, Myths, and Mysteries in 2018. Referring to von Däniken's support of the ancient astronauts hypothesis, Feder explains how his evidence is used and presented in a misleading manner in order to convince the reader that extraterrestrial life was involved in the development of ancient civilizations.

Plagiarism controversies 
Soon after the publication of Chariots of the Gods?, von Däniken was accused of stealing the ideas of French author Robert Charroux.

A 2004 article in Skeptic magazine states that von Däniken plagiarized many of the book's concepts from The Morning of the Magicians, that this book in turn was heavily influenced by the Cthulhu Mythos, and that the core of the ancient astronaut theory originates in H. P. Lovecraft's stories "The Call of Cthulhu" and At the Mountains of Madness.

Discredited artifact 

One artifact offered as evidence in the book has been disclaimed by von Däniken himself. Chariots asserts that a supposedly rust-free iron pillar in India was evidence of extraterrestrial influence, but von Däniken admitted in a Playboy interview that the pillar was man-made and that as far as supporting his theories goes "we can forget about this iron thing." Neither this nor any other discredited evidence, however, has been removed from subsequent editions of Chariots of the Gods?

Popular response 
Chariots of the Gods? was on The New York Times bestseller list and helped to launch von Däniken's career as a public speaker. Von Däniken had sold 70 million copies of his books as of January 2017.

Adaptations
The book was adapted as a German documentary film, Chariots of the Gods, produced by Terra-Filmkunst. The film was released in 1970 in West Germany and first appeared in the United States the following year. It was nominated for the Academy Award for Best Documentary Feature at the 43rd Academy Awards in 1971.

In 1972, an edited version of the film appeared as a TV documentary called In Search of Ancient Astronauts on NBC and was produced by Alan Landsburg Productions. The documentary was narrated by Rod Serling. A follow-up called In Search of Ancient Mysteries aired the following year, also narrated by Serling. The documentary series In Search Of..., which Leonard Nimoy hosted (Serling having died in 1975), was premiered on the basis of those two "pilot" films.

A different TV documentary, Horizon Special: The Case of the Ancient Astronauts directed by Graham Massey, was released in 1977 and examined von Däniken's claims.

In 1993, von Däniken produced a 25-part series titled Auf den Spuren der All-Mächtigen (Pathways of the Gods) for German television station, Sat.1. In 1996, a one-hour television special called, Chariots Of The Gods – The Mysteries Continue, aired on ABC and was produced by ABC/Kane. ABC/Kane produced another television special with von Däniken the following year called The Mysterious World – Search for Ancient Technology. It aired on the Discovery Channel in the United States and on RTL in Germany.

The global media rights to the book have since been purchased by Media Invest Entertainment which is developing a "360-degree entertainment" franchise entitled Chariots of the Gods. Today, documentaries espousing alien mythology can be found on most streaming platforms and are plentiful on YouTube.

Legacy
Chariots of the Gods? spawned multiple sequels, including Gods from Outer Space and The Gods Were Astronauts. The theory in the original book is said to have influenced a variety of science fiction books, films, and television series. For instance, it is considered the inspiration for the History Channel television series, Ancient Aliens.

The concept of ancient extraterrestrials has been used as a plot element in television shows and movies like Star Trek (which actually addressed the question before von Däniken's book was published), Stargate, The Thing, The X-Files, the Alien franchise (most notably, Prometheus), Neon Genesis Evangelion, Indiana Jones and the Kingdom of the Crystal Skull and The Eternals.

See also 

 Ancient Aliens, TV series
 Out-of-place artifact
 The Sirius Mystery
 Vaimanika Shastra
 Vimana

References

External links 
 Erich von Däniken's "Chariots of the Gods?": Science or Charlatanism? by Robert Sheaffer
 Chariots of Lies: Did aliens really build the Pyramids?
 Erinnerungen an die Zukunft (1970) IMDb Entry
 Chariots of the gods
 Center for Ancient Astronaut Research
 

Ancient astronaut speculation
1968 non-fiction books
UFO-related literature
UFO religions
Books about extraterrestrial life
Pseudohistory
Pseudoarchaeological texts
G. P. Putnam's Sons books
Mythology books
Non-fiction books adapted into films
Books involved in plagiarism controversies
Flying chariots
German-language books